XLIII (Howitzer) Brigade, Royal Field Artillery was a brigade of the Royal Field Artillery which served in the First World War.

It was originally formed with 30th, 40th and 57th (Howitzer) Batteries, each equipped with 4.5-inch howitzers, and attached to 1st Division. In August 1914, it mobilised and was sent to the Continent with the British Expeditionary Force, where it saw service with 1st Division until broken up. 57th Battery was withdrawn in May 1915, and assigned to 128th (Howitzer) Brigade.

In May 1916, the artillery brigades of infantry divisions were reorganised; the pure howitzer brigades were disbanded, and their batteries attached individually to field brigades, in order to produce mixed brigades of three field batteries and one howitzer battery. Accordingly, the brigade was broken up and the batteries dispersed; 30th to 39th Brigade, and 40th to 26th Brigade.

External links
Royal Field Artillery Brigades
1st Division Order of Battle

Notes

References

Royal Field Artillery brigades
Artillery units and formations of World War I